Cabassou virus is an RNA virus in the genus Alphavirus.

References

Alphaviruses